The Never Ending Tour is the popular name for Bob Dylan's endless touring schedule since June 7, 1988.

Background
The Never Ending Tour 1993 started on February 5 in Dublin, Ireland. On February 7 Dylan started a six show run at Hammersmith Apollo in London, England. The tour came to an end on February 25 in Northern Ireland at the Maysfield Leisure Centre.

Dylan then travelled to North America to perform a nine date tour of the United States. The tour culminated with a performance at the New Orleans Jazz & Heritage Festival.

On June 12 Dylan returned to Europe with a performance at Fleadh Festival in London. He then travelled to Israel where he performed three concerts before moving on to Athens, Greece with two performances at the Mount Lycabettus open–air theatre. Dylan then went on to perform three concerts in Italy, two concerts in France, six concerts in Spain, one in Ireland, two in Portugal and the tour came to an end on July 17 in Bern, Switzerland.

Dylan returned to North America in the late summer to perform a thirty–one date tour the United States and Canada with Santana. The tour covered twenty–nine cities in fifteen states, and two Canadian provinces. On November 16 and 17, Dylan performed four unplugged shows at The Supper Club in New York, playing two concerts on each day, one in the afternoon and the other in the evening. The tour came to an end after eighty shows, the second shortest tour of the Never Ending Tour.

Tour dates

Notes

References

External links

BobLinks – Comprehensive log of concerts and set lists
Bjorner's Still on the Road – Information on recording sessions and performances

Bob Dylan concert tours
Santana (band) concert tours
1993 concert tours

Plaza de Toros de Huesca